Nationality words link to articles with information on the nation's poetry or literature (for instance, Irish or France).

Events
 January – The Geração de Orpheu launch the short-lived magazine Orpheu, introducing literary modernism to Portugal.
 February – The group of young Colombian writers and artists in Medellín, los Panidas, first publish their magazine Panida, including the first published poem of León de Greiff, the editor (writing as Leo le Gris), "Ballad of the Mad Owls".
 April 6 – Publication in London of the American Ezra Pound's poetry collection Cathay, "translations... for the most part of the Chinese of Rihaku, from the notes of the late Ernest Fenollosa, and the decipherings of the Professors Mori and Ariga", by Elkin Mathews.
 April 24 – Deportation of Armenian notables from Istanbul begins. Among deported poets killed as part of the Armenian genocide are Ardashes Harutiunian, Jacques Sayabalian, Ruben Sevak and Siamanto.
 c. May – Publication of the first modern book illustrated with wood engravings, Frances Cornford's Spring Morning (published by The Poetry Bookshop, London) with engravings by the poet's cousin Gwen Raverat.
 July – Others: A Magazine of the New Verse is founded by Alfred Kreymborg; it will run until 1917, publishing poetry, other writing and visual art.
 August–December – Ezra Pound is completing the first sections of his poem The Cantos.

Poets and World War I
see also "Deaths in World War I" in the "Deaths" section, below

May 13 – While Julian Grenfell stands talking with other officers, a shell lands a few yards away and a splinter hits him in the head. He is taken to a hospital in Boulogne, where he dies 13 days later. His poem "Into Battle" is published in The Times the day after his death. His younger brother Gerald William (Billy) Grenfell is killed in action 2 months later.
 August 3–4 – English poet and lance corporal F. W. Harvey undertakes an action of "conspicuous gallantry" while fighting in France for which he is awarded the Distinguished Conduct Medal.
 September 11 – Publication of Lucy Whitmell's poem "Christ in Flanders" in The Spectator.
 Expatriate Belgian poet Émile Cammaerts' poems are published in London by John Lane The Bodley Head as Belgian poems: chants patriotiques et autres poèmes in French with English translations by his wife, Tita Brand-Cammaerts.
 Blaise Cendrars, pen name of Frédéric Louis Sauser, a Swiss novelist and poet naturalized as a French citizen  in 1916, loses his right arm during his service in World War I

Works published in English

Australia
 C. J. Dennis, long poem The Songs of a Sentimental Bloke, after serialization in The Bulletin since 1909, Australia
 Henry Lawson, My Army, o my Army! and other Songs, Australia
 Shaw Neilson, Old Granny Sullivan, Sydney, Bookfellow, Australia

Canada
 Arthur Stanley Bourinot, Laurentian Lyrics and Other Poems
 John McCrae, "In Flanders Fields", a war memorial poem, is written on May 3 after McCrae's friend and former student, Lt. Alexis Helmer, was killed in battle (McCrae himself would not survive the war); later in the year the poem is published in Punch (Canadian poet published in the United Kingdom; see text of poem, above)
 Robert W. Norwood, His Lady of the Sonnets
 Duncan Campbell Scott, Lines in Memory of Edmund Morris
 Frederick George Scott, The Gates of Time, and Other Poems (London: Samuel Bagster & Sons.

United Kingdom
From My Boy Jackby Rudyard Kipling
“Has any one else had word of him?”
Not this tide.
For what is sunk will hardly swim,
Not with this wind blowing, and this tide.

“Oh, dear, what comfort can I find?”
None this tide,
Nor any tide,
Except he did not shame his kind —
Not even with that wind blowing, and that tide.

 Richard Aldington, Images 1910-15
 Rupert Brooke, 1914 & Other Poems
 G. K. Chesterton, Poems
 Frances Cornford, Spring Morning
 John Drinkwater, Swords and Ploughshares
 T. S. Eliot, The Love Song of J. Alfred Prufrock published in Poetry magazine in Chicago (June), then, later this year, in a book in the United Kingdom
 F. S. Flint, Cadences
 Wilfrid Gibson, Battle
 Thomas Hardy, "The Convergence of the Twain, lines on the loss of the Titanic"
 Ford Madox Hueffer, Antwerp
 Violet Jacob, Songs of Angus, Scottish poet
 Rudyard Kipling
 The Fringes of the Fleet, essays and poems
 "My Boy Jack", written after his beloved son, John (called Jack) goes missing in the Battle of Loos during World War I; years later, Jack's death is confirmed to Kipling and his family; a play and film with the same title are later created, based on the Kipling family's loss
 Ronald Knox, Absolute and Abitofhell, first published in Oxford Magazine (November 28, 1912); satirical verse on Foundations, 1912
 Richard Le Gallienne, The Silk-Hat Soldier, and Other Poems
 Francis Ledwidge, Songs of the Fields, Irish author published in the United Kingdom

 John McCrae, "In Flanders Fields", a war memorial poem, is written on May 3 after McCrae's friend and former student, Lt. Alexis Helmer, was killed in battle (McCrae himself would not survive the war); later in the year the poem is published in Punch (Canadian poet published in the United Kingdom)
 James Pittendrigh Macgillivray, Pro Patria, Scottish poet
 Alice Meynell, Poems of the War
 Jessie Pope, Jessie Pope's War Poems and More War Poems
 Ezra Pound, Cathay, American poet published in the United Kingdom
 Hardwicke Rawnsley, The European War 1914-1915: Poems
 Herbert Read, Songs of Chaos
 George William Russell, ("Æ"):
 Gods of War, with Other Poems
 Imaginations and Reveries
Edith Sitwell, The Mother and Other Poems
 James Stephens, Irish author published in the United Kingdom:
 The Adventures of Seumas Beg: The Rocky Road to Dublin
 Songs from the Clay
 J. R. R. Tolkien, "Goblin Feet", published in Oxford Poetry
 Katharine Tynan, Flower of Youth: poems in war time
 Anna Wickham, The Contemplative Quarry

Anthologies
 H. B. Elliott, ed., Lest We Forget: A War Anthology
 Poems of Today
 Ezra Pound, ed., Catholic Anthology, London
 War Poems from The Times, August 1914-1915

Some Imagist Poets anthology
Contents to Some Imagist Poets anthology, the first of three books with the same title published in the next two years (includes English and American poets):
 Richard Aldington: "Childhood", "The Poplar", "Round-Pond", "Daisy", "Epigrams", "The Faun sees Snow for the First Time", "Lemures"
 H.D. (Hilda Doolittle): "The Pool", "The Garden", "Sea Lily", "Sea Iris", "Sea Rose", "Oread", "Orion Dead"
 John Gould Fletcher: "The Blue Symphony", "London Excursion"
 F. S. Flint: "Trees", "Lunch", "Malady", "Accident", "Fragment", "Houses", "Eau-Forte"
 D. H. Lawrence: "Ballad of Another Ophelia", "Illicit", "Fireflies in the Corn", "A Woman and Her Dead Husband", "The Mowers", "Scent of Irises", "Green"
 Amy Lowell: "Venus Transiens", "The Travelling Bear", "The Letter", "Grotesque", "Bullion", "Solitaire", "The Bombardment"

United States
See also "Some Imagist Poets" subsection, above
 Djuna Barnes, The Book of Repulsive Women, her first book of poems, which she described as a collection of "rhythms and drawings"
 Stephen Vincent Benet, Five Men and Pompey
 Adelaide Crapsey, Verse, featuring her invention of the quintain, a five-line form
 T. S. Eliot, The Love Song of J. Alfred Prufrock first published in Poetry magazine
 John Gould Fletcher, Irradiations: Sand and Spray
 Ring Lardner, Bib Ballads
 Archibald MacLeish, Songs for a Summer's Day
 Edgar Lee Masters, Spoon River Anthology
 John G. Neihardt, The Song of Hugh Glass
 Ezra Pound:
 Cathay, American poet published in the United Kingdom
 Editor, Catholic Anthology, London
 Sara Teasdale, Rivers to the Sea

Other in English
 Roby Datta, Indian poet writing in English:
 Poems: Pictures and Songs to which is prefixed "The Philosophy of Art" Calcutta: Das Gupta and Co.
 Stories in blank verse to which is added an epic fragment, Calcutta: Das Gupta & Co.
 Francis Ledwidge, Songs of the Fields, Irish author published in the United Kingdom
 James Stephens, Irish author published in the United Kingdom:
 The Adventures of Seumas Beg; The Rocky Road to Dublin
 Songs from the Clay

Works published in other languages

France
 Guillaume Apollinaire, pen name of Wilhelm Apollinaris de Kostrowitzky, Case d'armons
 Paul Claudel, Corona benignitatis anni dei
 Oscar Vladislas de Lubicz-Milosz, also known as O. V. de L. Milosz, Poèmes
 Pierre Reverdy, Poèmes en prose

Other languages
 José de Almada Negreiros, A Cena do Ódio ("The Scene of Hate"), Portuguese
 Walter Flex, Sonne und Schilde, German
 Yvan Goll, Élegies internationales: Pamphlets contre la guerre, German poet in Switzerland writing in French
 Uri Zvi Greenberg, Ergets oyf felder ("Somewhere in the fields"), Yiddish published in Austria-Hungary
 Sir Muhammad Iqbal, Asrar-i-Khudi (Urdu: اسرار خودی) or The Secrets of the Self his first philosophical book of poetry, published in Persian
 Vasily Kamensky, Stenka Razin (Стенька Разин), Russian
 Wilhelm Klemm, Gloria: Kriegsgedichte aus dem Felde, German
 Vladimir Mayakovsky, A Cloud in Trousers (Oblako v shtanakh), Russian
 Narasinghrao, Smaranasamhita, an elegy to his son, Indian, writing in Gujarati
 Barbu Nemțeanu, Stropi de soare, Romanian
 Georg Trakl, Sebastian im Traum ("Sebastian in the Dream"); Austrian poet published in Germany

Awards and honors

 Nobel Prize for Literature: Romain Rolland (French)

Births
Death years link to the corresponding "[year] in poetry" article:
 January 8 – Mira Mendelson (died 1968), Russian poet, writer, translator and librettist
 January 12 – Margaret Danner (died 1984), African-American
 January 15 – Chaganti Somayajulu (died 1994), Indian, Telugu-language short-story writer and poet
 January 31 – Thomas Merton (died 1968), American poet, author and monk
 March 12 – José Luis Rodríguez Vélez (died 1984), Panamanian composer, orchestra director, saxophonist, clarinetist and guitarist
 April 21 – John Manifold (died 1985), Australian
 April 22 – Hem Barua (died 1977), Indian, Assamese-language poet and politician
 May 28 – Dorothy Auchterlonie (died 1991), Australian
 May 30 – Michael Thwaites (died 2005), Australian poet, academic, intelligence officer and activist
 May 31 – Judith Wright (died 2000), Australian
 June 8
 Kayyar Kinhanna Rai (died 2015), Indian
 Ruth Stone (died 2011), American poet, recipient of 2002 National Book Award and 2002 Wallace Stevens Award
 July 1 – Alun Lewis (killed 1944 on active service), Welsh war poet
 July 7 – Margaret Walker (died 1998), African-American poet and novelist
 July 16 – David Campbell (died 1979), Australian
 August – Bawa Balwant (died 1973), Indian, Punjabi poet
 August 4 – Patrick Anderson (died 1979), English-born Canadian
 August 28 – Claude Roy, pen name of Claude Orland (died 1997), French poet, novelist, essayist, art critic and journalist; an activist in the Communist Party until his expulsion in 1956
 September 5 – Maheswar Neog (died 1995), Indian, Assamese-language scholar and poet
 November 3 – Eric Roach (suicide 1974), Caribbean poet from Tobago
 November 8 – George Sutherland Fraser (died 1980), Scottish-born poet and critic
 December 8 – Nikos Gatsos (died 1992), Greek
 December 22 – David Martin (died 1997), Australian
 December 27 – John Cornford (killed 1936 in Spanish Civil War), English
 December 31 – Sam Ragan (died 1996), American poet and journalist, North Carolina Poet Laureate, 1982–1996
 Also:
 Nanina Alba (died 1968), African-American
 Akhtarul Imam, Indian, Urdu-language poet in the "Halqa-i-Arba-i Zauq" movement
 K. S. Narasimha Swami, better known as "K.S. NA", Indian, Kannada-language poet
 Manmohan, pen name of Gopal Narhar Natu, Indian, Marathi-language poet
 Nand Lal Ambardar (died 1973), Indian, Kashmiri-language poet
 Palagummi Padmaraju (died 1983), short-story writer, poet, film-industry writer
 Prabhu Chugani, "Wafa", Indian, Sindhi-language poet
 Rameshvar Shukla, pen name: Anchal, wrote in Khadi Boli and Braj Bhasa dialects of Hindi, poet, short-story writer and novelist
 Sumitra Kumari Sinha, Indian, Hindi-language poet and short-story writer

Deaths
Birth years link to the corresponding "[year] in poetry" article:
 January 3 – James Elroy Flecker (born 1884), English poet, novelist and dramatist, from tuberculosis in Switzerland
 February 8 – Takashi Nagatsuka 長塚 節 (born 1879), Japanese poet and novelist
 July 10 – Vazha-Pshavela (died 1861), Georgian poet
 September 4 – Helen Hinsdale Rich (born 1827), American poet
 December 1 – Stuart Merrill (born 1863), American Symbolist poet writing in French, from heart disease
 Also
 Hortensia Antommarchi (born 1850), Colombian poet
 Edmond Laforest (born 1876), Haitian French language poet, suicide
 V. C. Balakrishna Panikker (born 1889), Indian, Malayalam-language poet

Killed in World War I
see also "Poets and World War I" in the "Events" section and Rudyard Kipling poem "My Boy Jack", above

 April 23
 Rupert Brooke, English poet and writer, 27, died of septic pneumonia from an infected mosquito bite while sailing with the British Mediterranean Expeditionary Force off the island of Lemnos in the Aegean on its way to Gallipoli
 Robert W. Sterling, Scottish poet, 21, killed in action
 May 8 – Walter Lyon, Scottish war poet, 28, missing in action
 May 26 – Julian Grenfell, English war poet, 27, killed at Ypres
 July 30 – Gerald William Grenfell, English war poet, 25, killed in action
 September 1 – August Stramm, German poet and playwright, 41, killed in action on the Eastern Front
 October 13 – Charles Sorley, British poet, 20, shot in the head by a sniper, at the Battle of Loos in France
 December 23 – Roland Leighton, English war poet, 20, died of wounds in Casualty Clearing Station at Louvencourt, having been shot through the stomach by a sniper at Hébuterne

See also

 List of years in poetry
 Dada
 Imagism
 Modernist poetry in English
 Silver Age of Russian Poetry
 Ego-Futurism movement in Russian poetry
 Expressionism movement in German poetry
 Young Poland (Polish: Młoda Polska) modernist period in Polish  arts and literature
 Poetry

Notes

Poetry
20th-century poetry